Belgravia is a suburb of Johannesburg, South Africa. It is located in Region F of the City of Johannesburg Metropolitan Municipality.

History
Prior to the discovery of gold on the Witwatersrand in 1886, the suburb lay on land on one of the original farms that make up Johannesburg, called Doornfontein. The land was purchased by Jeppe & Company and was laid out by J.B. Tucker in September 1889. The land company's objective was for an exclusive suburb with Sir Julius Jeppe, building his mansion called Friedenheim. It was formerly the eastern part of Jeppestown.

References

Johannesburg Region F
Suburbs of Johannesburg